Ronald Michael Cordova (born August 18, 1946) is an American lawyer and politician.

Born in Los Angeles, California, Cordova graduated from Beverly Hills High School,  Dartmouth College and the University of Southern California Law School. Cordova practices law in Irvine, California. From 1976 to 1978, Cordova served in the California State Assembly as a Democrat.

References

1946 births
Living people
Politicians from Los Angeles
People from Irvine, California
Hispanic and Latino American state legislators in California
Dartmouth College alumni
USC Gould School of Law alumni
California lawyers
Democratic Party members of the California State Assembly
20th-century American politicians